Le Rêve is a painting by Édouard Detaille created in 1888. It won the gold medal at the Salon in 1888.

Description
Le Rêve is a painting depicting the military - the specialty of its creator, Édouard Detaille. It shows an encampment of sleeping French soldiers that continues as far as the eye can see. The soldiers are young conscripts of the French Third Republic who are taking part in summer exercises, probably in Champagne. They are dreaming of the glory of their predecessors, and of exacting revenge following their country's defeat in the Franco-Prussian War. 

In a patriotic allegory, French soldiers from previous battles are depicted in the sky above in an intentionally indistinct way. They include soldiers from the French Revolutionary Army, as well as those involved in the battles of Austerlitz, Trocadero, Magenta and Solferino, the invasion of Algiers and the defeats at Gravelotte and Reichshoffen in 1870. 

This type of painting corresponds well with the sentiment of the time, evoking nostalgia for a unified, victorious France, and acting as a memento of a mythical France that was edging further into the past. For Detaille, creating this painting was to "take a direct political position", showing his support for nationalist general Georges Boulanger, as well as celebrating the army.

References

Further reading

1888 paintings
Paintings by Édouard Detaille
Paintings in the collection of the Musée d'Orsay
War paintings